Godfather of Gore may refer to:

 Herschell Gordon Lewis (1929-2016), American filmmaker
 Lucio Fulci (1927–1996), Italian film director, screenwriter, and actor
 Tom Savini (born 1946), American actor, stuntman, director, and special effects and makeup artist